The history of the People's Republic of China details the history of mainland China since 1 October 1949, when CCP chairman Mao Zedong proclaimed the People's Republic of China (PRC) from atop Tiananmen, after a near complete victory (1949) by the Chinese Communist Party (CCP) in the Chinese Civil War. The PRC is the most recent political entity to govern mainland China, preceded by the Republic of China (ROC; 1912–1949) and thousands of years of monarchical dynasties. The paramount leaders have been Mao Zedong (1949-1976); Hua Guofeng (1976-1978); Deng Xiaoping (1978-1989); Jiang Zemin (1989-2002); Hu Jintao (2002-2012); and Xi Jinping (2012 to present).

The origins of the People's Republic can be traced to the Chinese Soviet Republic that was proclaimed in 1931 in Ruijin (Jui-chin), Jiangxi (Kiangsi), with the backing of the All-Union Communist Party in the Soviet Union in the midst of the Chinese Civil War against the Nationalist government only to dissolve in 1937.

Under Mao's rule, China went through a socialist transformation from a traditional peasant society, leaning towards heavy industries under planned economy, while campaigns such as the Great Leap Forward and the Cultural Revolution wreaked havoc on the entire country. Since late 1978, the economic reforms led by Deng Xiaoping had made China the world's second-largest and one of the fastest growing economies, with a specialty in high productivity factories and leadership in some areas of high technology. Globally, after receiving support from the USSR in the 1950s, China became bitter enemy of USSR on a worldwide basis until Mikhail Gorbachev's visit to China in May 1989. In the 21st century, the new wealth and technology led to a contest for primacy in Asian affairs versus India, Japan and the United States, and since 2017 a growing trade war with the United States.

Mao era (1949–1976)

Socialist transformation 

Following the Chinese Civil War and victory of Mao Zedong's Communist forces over the Kuomintang forces of Generalissimo Chiang Kai-shek, who fled to Taiwan, Mao Zedong proclaimed the founding of the People's Republic of China (PRC) on 1 October 1949. Mao laid heavy theoretical emphasis on command economy and class struggle, and ruled as a dictator.

After the Korean War ended in 1953, Mao Zedong launched campaigns to persecute former landlords and merchants, starting the industrialisation program at the same time. Mao's first goal was a total overhaul of the land ownership system, and extensive land reforms, including the execution of more powerful landlords. China's old system of gentry landlord ownership of farmland and tenant peasants was replaced with a distribution system in favor of poor/landless peasants which significantly reduced economic inequality. Over a million landlords were executed in the Chinese land reform. In Zhangzhuangcun, in the more thoroughly reformed north of the country, most "landlords" and "rich peasants" had lost all their land and often their lives or had fled. All formerly landless workers had received land, which eliminated this category altogether. As a result, "middling peasants", who now accounted for 90% of the village population, owned 91% of the land. Drug trafficking and opium use were largely wiped out. Foreign investments were seized and outsiders were expelled.

At the same time, political movements and class struggles were launched nationwide. The Anti-Rightist Campaign of 1957–1958 significantly damaged the democracy in China, during which at least 550,000 people were persecuted, most of whom were intellectuals and political dissidents. After the campaign, China entered the de facto one-party state of the Chinese Communist Party. Other major political movements in 1950s included the Suppression of Counter-revolutionaries, the Three-anti and Five-anti Campaigns and the Sufan Movement, each of which resulted in a large number of deaths nationwide.

Great Leap Forward and aftermath 

Mao Zedong believed that socialism would eventually triumph over all other ideologies, and following the First Five-Year Plan based on a Soviet-style centrally controlled economy, Mao took on the ambitious project of the Great Leap Forward in 1958, beginning an unprecedented process of collectivisation in rural areas (the People's commune). Mao urged the use of communally organised iron smelters to increase steel production, pulling workers off of agricultural labor to the point that large amounts of crops rotted unharvested. Mao decided to continue to advocate these smelters despite a visit to a factory steel mill which proved to him that high quality steel could only be produced in a factory. He thought that ending the program would dampen peasant enthusiasm for his political mobilisation, the Great Leap Forward.

The implementation of Maoism thought in China may have been responsible for the deadliest famine in human history, in which 15-55 million people died due to starvation and epidemics. By the end of 1961, the birth rate was nearly cut in half because of malnutrition. In 1958, the Xunhua uprising broke out and in 1959, a major uprising erupted in Tibet, resulting in the deaths of tens of thousands of Tibetans, and the Dalai Lama went into exile afterwards. Mao's failure with the Leap reduced his power in government, whose administrative duties fell to President Liu Shaoqi and Deng Xiaoping, especially after the Seven Thousand Cadres Conference in early 1962. The power struggle between Mao Zedong and Liu Shaoqi together with Deng Xiaoping began after 1962. The Socialist Education Movement was launched by Mao from 1963 to 1965, as a result.

Much more successful was the "Two Bombs, One Satellite" program, launched in 1958, with the help at first of Moscow. It used leading scientists who returned to mainland China from abroad, including Qian Xuesen, Deng Jiaxian and Qian Sanqiang. China's first atomic bomb, nuclear missile, hydrogen bomb and artificial satellite were all successfully developed by 1970. However, the program had been seriously affected by the Great Leap Forward and the Cultural Revolution.

Cultural Revolution 

In 1963, Mao Zedong launched the Socialist Education Movement, which is regarded as the precursor of the Cultural Revolution. To impose socialist orthodoxy and rid China of "old elements", and at the same time serving certain political goals, Mao began the Cultural Revolution in May 1966, attempting to return to the center of political power in China. The campaign was far reaching into all aspects of Chinese life. Estimated death toll ranges from hundreds of thousands to 20 million. Massacres took place across the country while massive cannibalism also occurred; Red Guards terrorized the streets as many ordinary citizens were deemed counter-revolutionaries; education and public transportation came to a nearly complete halt; daily life involved shouting slogans and reciting Mao quotations; many prominent political leaders, including Liu Shaoqi and Deng Xiaoping, were purged and deemed "capitalist roaders". The campaign would not come to a complete end until the death of Mao Zedong and arrest of the Gang of Four in 1976. The second constitution of China, known as the "1975 Constitution", was passed in 1975 during the Cultural Revolution.

On the other hand, by the time of Mao's death, China's unity and sovereignty were assured for the first time in a century, and there was development of infrastructure, industry, healthcare, education (only 20% of the population could read in 1949, compared to 65.5% thirty years later), which raised standard of living for the average Chinese. There is also an argument that campaigns such as the Great Leap Forward – an example of the concept New Democracy – and the Cultural Revolution were essential in jumpstarting China's development and "purifying" its culture: even though the consequences of both these campaigns were economically and humanly disastrous, they left behind a "clean slate" on which later economic progress could be built.

Foreign relations 
The primary foreign policy was to obtain diplomatic recognition in the face of strong American opposition. Thus in 1964, tensions between Washington and Paris allowed France to open relations.

India

In 1950, India became one of the first countries to recognize People's Republic of China and establish formal diplomatic relation. However, India had close ties to the USSR and in 1962, a one-month Sino-Indian war and also a one-month Second Sino-Indian war in 1967 broke out along their remote border. Border tensions flared from time to time ever since.

Soviet Union

Beijing was very pleased that the success of the Soviet Union in the space race – the original Sputniks – demonstrated that the international communist movement had caught up in high technology with the Americans. Mao assumed that the Soviets now had a military advantage and should step up the Cold War; Khrushchev knew that the Americans were well ahead in military uses of space. The strains multiplied, quickly making a dead letter of the 1950 alliance, destroying the socialist camp unity, and affected the world balance of power. The split started with Nikita Khrushchev De-Stalinization program. It angered Mao, who admired Stalin.  Moscow and Beijing became worldwide rivals, forcing communist parties around the world to take sides; many of them split, so that the pro-Soviet communists were battling the pro-Chinese communists for local control of the left-wing forces in much of the world.

Internally, the Sino-Soviet split  encouraged Mao to plunge China into the Cultural Revolution, to expunge traces of Russian ways of thinking.  Mao argued that as far as all-out nuclear war was concerned, the human race would not be destroyed, and instead a brave new communist world would arise from the ashes of imperialism. This attitude troubled Moscow, which had a more realistic view of the utter disasters that would accompany a nuclear war. Three major issues suddenly became critical in dividing the two nations: Taiwan, India, and China's Great Leap Forward. Although Moscow supported Beijing's position that Taiwan entirely belong to China, it demanded that it be forewarned of any invasion or serious threat that would bring American intervention. Beijing refused, and the Chinese bombardment of the island of Quemoy in August 1958 escalated the tensions. Moscow was cultivating India, both as a major purchaser of Russian munitions, and a strategically critical ally. However China was escalating its threats to the northern fringes of India, especially from Tibet. It was building a militarily significant road system that would reach disputed areas along the border. The Russians clearly favored India, and Beijing reacted as a betrayal. By far the major ideological issue was the Great Leap Forward, which represented a Chinese rejection of the Soviet form of economic development. Moscow was deeply resentful, especially since it had spent heavily to supply China with high-technology—including some nuclear skills. Moscow withdrew its vitally needed technicians and economic and military aid. Khrushchev was increasingly crude and intemperate ridiculing China and Mao Zedong to both communist and international audiences. Beijing responded through its official propaganda network of rejecting Moscow's claim to Lenin's heritage. Beijing insisted it was the true inheritor of the great Leninist tradition. At one major meeting of communist parties, Khrushchev personally attacked Mao as an ultra leftist — a left revisionist — and compared him to Stalin for dangerous egotism. The conflict was now out of control, and was increasingly fought out in 81 communist parties around the world. The final split came in July 1963, after 50,000 refugees escaped from Xinjiang in western China to Soviet territory to escape persecution. China ridiculed the Russian incompetence in the Cuban Missile Crisis of 1962 as adventurism to start with and capitulationism to wind up on the losing side. Moscow now was increasingly giving priority to friendly relationships and test ban treaties with the United States and United Kingdom.

Increasingly, Beijing began to consider the Soviet Union, which it viewed as Social imperialism, as the greatest threat it faced, more so than even the leading capitalist power, the United States. In turn, overtures were made between the PRC and the United States, such as in the Ping Pong Diplomacy, Panda Diplomacy and the 1972 Nixon visit to China.

Diplomatic relations established

China established formal relationships with several major western countries and Japan. Typically the other party broke relations it had with the government on Taiwan.

 In January 1964, PRC established formal diplomatic relations with France.
 In October 1970, PRC established formal diplomatic relations with Canada.
 In November 1970, PRC established formal diplomatic relations with Italy.
 In 1971, Albania's motion in the United Nations to recognize the People's Republic of China as the sole legal China (replacing the Republic of China) was passed as General Assembly Resolution 2758.
 In March 1972, China established formal diplomatic relations with the United Kingdom. The UK was the first major Western country to recognize the PRC in 1950.
 In September 1972, PRC established formal diplomatic relations with Japan.
 In October 1972, PRC established formal diplomatic relations with West Germany.
 In December 1972, PRC established formal diplomatic relations with Australia.
 In March 1973, PRC established formal diplomatic relations with Spain.

Disasters 
Only major disasters are presented below (click to show).

Controversies 

During the Mao era, tens of millions of people died during various political movements as well as during the Great Chinese Famine, while tens of millions of other people were persecuted and permanently crippled. China turned into a de facto one-party state after the Anti-Rightist Campaign starting in 1957, during which democracy and the rule of law were damaged while at least 550,000 intellectuals and political dissidents were persecuted. Moreover, the Cultural Revolution severely damaged the rule of law as well as traditional Chinese culture and moral values; massacres were committed across the country and acts of cannibalism were also committed on a massive scale (e.g., Guangxi Massacre). Higher education was halted during the Cultural Revolution and scientific research was also seriously affected because many scientists were persecuted, killed or committed suicide. Some doubt statistics or accounts given for death tolls or other damages incurred by Mao's campaigns, attributing the high death toll to natural disasters, famine, or other consequences of political chaos during the rule of Chiang Kai-shek.

Mao Zedong and the Chinese Communist Party (CCP) also exported the ideology of socialism and socialist revolution to other parts of the world, especially to Southeast Asia. Influenced and supported by Mao and the CCP, Pol Pot and the Khmer Rouge conducted the Cambodian genocide during which 1.5-2 million people were killed in just three years.

Transition and the Deng era (1976–1989)

The transition period 

Mao Zedong's death was followed by a power struggle between the Gang of Four, Hua Guofeng, and eventually Deng Xiaoping. The third constitution of China, known as the "1978 Constitution", was passed in 1978 under Hua's "Two Whatevers".

In December 1978, with the support of Ye Jianying and other high-ranking officials, Deng eventually replaced Hua and became the paramount leader of China during the 3rd Plenary Session of the 11th Central Committee of CCP. Deng's allies such as Hu Yaobang and Zhao Ziyang also received promotions.

Invalidating the Cultural Revolution 

In September 1977, Deng first proposed the idea of "Boluan Fanzheng", attempting to dismantle the far-left Maoist policies associated with the Cultural Revolution. In the same year, he resumed the National College Entrance Examination which was cancelled for ten years due to the Cultural Revolution. Moreover, within several years, victims of more than 3 million "unjust, false, wrongful cases" were rehabilitated by Deng and his allies such as Hu Yaobang, then General Secretary of the Chinese Communist Party. However, on the subject of Mao's legacy, Deng coined the famous phrase "7 parts good, 3 parts bad" and avoided denouncing Mao altogether. A major document presented at the September 1979 Fourth Plenum, gave a "preliminary assessment" of the entire 30-year period of Communist rule. At the plenum, party Vice Chairman Ye Jianying declared the Cultural Revolution "an appalling catastrophe" and "the most severe setback to [the] socialist cause since [1949]".

In June 1981, the Chinese government's condemnation of the Cultural Revolution culminated in the Resolution on Certain Questions in the History of Our Party Since the Founding of the People's Republic of China, adopted by the Sixth Plenary Session of the Eleventh Central Committee of the Chinese Communist Party. This resolution invalidated the Cultural Revolution as a "domestic havoc", but it stated that "Comrade Mao Zedong was a great Marxist and a great proletarian revolutionary, strategist and theorist. It is true that he made gross mistakes during the "Cultural Revolution", but, if we judge his activities as a whole, his contributions to the Chinese revolution far outweigh his mistakes. His merits are primary and his errors secondary". Today, the public perception of Mao has improved at least superficially; images of Mao and Mao related objects have become fashionable, commonly used on novelty items and even as talismans.

As an aftermath of the Cultural Revolution, nationwide public safety worsened in the late 1970s and early 1980s, and as a result Deng launched the "Strike Hard" Anti-crime Campaign in 1983 which lasted until early 1987. More than 1.7 million people were arrested and received legal punishment during the campaign.

Reforms and Opening-up 

At the Third Plenum of the Eleventh National Party Congress Central Committee, Deng embarked China on the road to Reform and Opening-up (改革开放 Gaige Kaifang), policies that began with the de-collectivisation of the countryside, followed with industrial reforms aimed at decentralizing government controls in the industrial sector. In 1979, Deng emphasized the goal of "Four Modernizations" and further proposed the idea of "xiaokang", or "moderately prosperous society". Deng laid emphasis on light industry as a stepping stone to the development of heavy industries. The achievements of Lee Kuan Yew to create an economic superpower in Singapore had a profound effect on the Communist leadership in China. Leaders in China made a major effort, especially under Deng Xiaoping, to emulate his policies of economic growth, entrepreneurship, and subtle suppression of dissent. Over the years, more than 22,000 Chinese officials were sent to Singapore to study its methods.

Deng championed the idea of Special Economic Zones (SEZ), including Shenzhen, Zhuhai and Xiamen, areas where foreign investment would be allowed to pour in without strict government restraint and regulations, running on a basically capitalist system. On 31 January 1979, the Shekou Industrial Zone of Shenzhen was founded, becoming the first experimental area in China to "open up". Under the leadership of Yuan Geng, the "Shekou model" of development was gradually formed, embodied in its famous slogan "Time is Money, Efficiency is Life", which then widely spread to other parts of China. In January 1984, Deng Xiaoping made his first inspection tour to Shenzhen and Zhuhai, recognizing the "Shenzhen Speed" of development as well as the success of the special economics zones. With the help of Yuan Geng, the first joint-stock commercial bank in China — the China Merchants Bank — and the first joint-stock insurance company in China — the Ping An Insurance — were both established in Shekou. In May 1984, fourteen coastal cities in China including Shanghai, Guangzhou and Tianjin were named "Open Coastal Cities (沿海开放城市)".

Deng recognized the importance of science and technology in the "Four Modernizations", pointing out that "science and technology are the primary productive force". In December 1981, he approved the construction of "Beijing Electron–Positron Collider", the first high-energy particle collider in China, and had several meetings with Nobel laureate Tsung-Dao Lee who supported the project. In 1985, the Great Wall Station, the first Chinese research station in Antarctica, was established. In 1986, Deng approved the proposal from four leading Chinese scientists and launched the "863 Program"; in the same year, the nine-year compulsory education system was established under law (Law on Nine-Year Compulsory Education). In the 1980s, Qinshan Nuclear Power Plant in Zhejiang and Daya Bay Nuclear Power Plant in Shenzhen were built, becoming the first two nuclear power plants in China. Deng also approved the appointments of foreign nationals to work in China, including the renowned Chinese-American mathematician Shiing-Shen Chern.

Supporters of the economic reforms point to the rapid development of the consumer and export sectors of the economy, the creation of an urban middle class that now constitutes 15% of the population, higher living standards (which is shown via dramatic increases in GDP per capita, consumer spending, life expectancy, literacy rate, and total grain output) and a much wider range of personal rights and freedoms for average Chinese as evidence of the success of the reforms. Critics of the economic reforms, both in China and abroad, claim that the reforms have caused wealth disparity, environmental pollution, rampant corruption, widespread unemployment associated with layoffs at inefficient state-owned enterprises, and has introduced often unwelcome cultural influences. Consequently, they believe that China's culture has been corrupted, the poor have been reduced to a hopeless abject underclass, and that the social stability is threatened. They are also of the opinion that various political reforms, such as moves towards popular elections, have been unfairly nipped in the bud.

After all, the path of modernisation and market-oriented economic reforms that China started since the early 1980s appears to be fundamentally unchallenged. Even critics of China's market reforms do not wish to see a backtrack of these two decades of reforms, but rather propose corrective measures to offset some of the social issues caused by existing reforms. On the other hand, in 1979, the Chinese government instituted a one child policy to try to control its rapidly increasing population. The controversial policy resulted in a dramatic decrease in child poverty. The law was eliminated in 2015.

Political reforms 

On 18 August 1980, Deng Xiaoping gave a speech titled "On the Reform of the Party and State Leadership System (党和国家领导制度改革)" at an enlarged meeting of the Political Bureau of the CCP Central Committee in Beijing, launching the political reforms in China. He called for the end of bureaucracy, centralisation of power as well as patriarchy, proposing term limits to the leading positions in China and advocating the "democratic centralism" as well as the "collective leadership". In addition, Deng proposed to the National People's Congress a systematic revision of China's constitution (the 1978 Constitution), and emphasized that the Constitution must be able to protect the civil rights of Chinese citizens and must reflect the principle of separation of powers; he also described the idea of "collective leadership" and championed the principle of "one man, one vote" among leaders to avoid the dictatorship of the General Secretary of CCP. In December 1982, the fourth Constitution of the People's Republic, known as the "1982 Constitution", was passed by the 5th National People's Congress, embodying Chinese-style constitutionalism with most of its content still being effective as of today.

In the first half of 1986, Deng repeatedly called for the revival of political reforms, as further economic reforms were hindered by the original political system while the country had seen an increasing trend of corruption and economic inequality, aggravated by the many social privileges enjoyed by governmental officials and their relatives. A five-man research unit for China's political reforms was established in September 1986, and the members included Zhao Ziyang, Hu Qili, Tian Jiyun, Bo Yibo and Peng Chong. Deng's intention of political reforms was to boost the administrative efficiency, further separate the responsibilities between the Communist Party and the Government, and to eliminate bureaucracy. Although he also mentioned "rule of law" and "democracy", Deng delimited the reforms within the one-party system and opposed the implementation of Western-style constitutionalism. In October 1987, at the 13th National Congress of CCP chaired by Deng, Zhao Ziyang delivered an important talk drafted by Bao Tong on the political reforms. In his speech titled "Advance Along the Road of Socialism with Chinese characteristics (沿着有中国特色的社会主义道路前进)", Zhao argued that the socialism in China was still in its primary stage and by taking Deng's speech in 1980 as guidelines, Zhao outlined a variety of steps to be taken for the political reforms, including promoting the rule of law and the separation of powers, imposing de-centralisation, and improving the election system. At this Congress, Zhao was elected as the new General Secretary of CCP.

However, after the 1989 Tiananmen Square protests and massacre, many leading reformists including Zhao and Bao were removed from their posts, and the majority of the planned political reforms (after 1986) ended drastically. Left-wing conservatives led by Chen Yun, President Li Xiannian and Premier Li Peng took control until Deng Xiaoping's southern tour in early 1992. On the other hand, many policies due to the political reforms launched by Deng in the early 1980s remain effective after 1989 (such as the new Constitution, term limits, and the democratic centralism), even though some of them have been reversed by CCP general secretary Xi Jinping after 2012.

Political turmoil 

In 1983, left-wing conservatives initiated the "Anti-Spiritual Pollution Campaign".

In 1986, the student demonstrations led to the resignation of Hu Yaobang, then General Secretary of CCP and a leading reformist, and the left-wing conservatives continued to launch the "Anti-Bourgeois Liberalisation Campaign". The campaign ended in mid-1987 because Zhao Ziyang convinced Deng Xiaoping that the conservatives were taking advantage of the campaign to oppose the Reforms and Opening-up program.

Although standards of living improved significantly in the 1980s, Deng's reforms were not without criticism. Hard-liners asserted that Deng opened China once again to various social evils, and an overall increase in materialistic thinking, while liberals attacked Deng's unrelenting stance on wider political reforms. Liberal forces began gathering in different forms to protest against the Party's authoritarian leadership. In 1989, the death of Hu Yaobang, a liberal figure, triggered weeks of spontaneous protests in the Tiananmen Square. The government imposed martial law and sent in tanks and soldiers to suppress the demonstrations. Western countries and multilateral organisations briefly suspended their formal ties with China's government under Premier Li Peng's leadership, which was directly responsible for the military curfew and bloody crackdown.

Military modernisation 

In early 1979, China started a one-month war with Vietnam. Furthermore, China continued to support Khmer Rouge during Deng Xiaoping's time together with the United States, Thailand and several other countries to counter the regional influence of the Soviet Union.

In March 1981, Deng Xiaoping determined that a military exercise was necessary for the People's Liberation Army (PLA), and in September 1981, the North China Military Exercise took place, becoming the largest exercise conducted by the PLA since the founding of the People's Republic.

In 1985, in order to modernise the PLA and to save money, Deng cut 1 million troops from the military (百万大裁军) and ordered further modernisation.

Foreign relations 

On 1 January 1979, the People's Republic of China formally established its diplomatic relations with the United States. In January 1979, Deng Xiaoping visited the United States, which was first official visit by a paramount leader of China to the United States. In the same year, the Chinese Olympic Committee for PRC was recognized by the International Olympic Committee. Under the advice of Lee Kuan Yew, Deng Xiaoping agreed to further open up the country and stop exporting communist ideologies and revolutions to other countries like Mao did, and the decisions significantly improved the relations between China and many countries, especially those in south-east Asia.

In 1984, Xu Haifeng, a pistol shooter, won the first Olympic gold medal for China during the 1984 Summer Olympics in Los Angeles. In the same year, the Sino-British Joint Declaration was signed by China and the United Kingdom, stipulating that the sovereignty and the administrative management of Hong Kong would be handed over back to China on 1 July 1997 under the "one country, two systems" framework. In 1987, the Joint Declaration on the Question of Macau was signed by China and Portugal, stipulating that the sovereignty and the administrative management of Macau would be handed over back to China 20 December 1999, again under the "one country, two systems" framework.

In 1989, the relation between China and the Soviet Union returned to normal for the first time since the Sino-Soviet split in the 1950s. Mikhail Gorbachev, then General Secretary of the Communist Party of the Soviet Union, visited Beijing and met with Deng Xiaoping during the Sino-Soviet Summit, which took place amid the Tiananmen Square protests.

After the 1989 Tiananmen Square protests and massacre, China faced strong backlash from the western countries. Deng, as a response, devised a new set of diplomatic strategies for China, which were summarised to be "hide your strength, bide your time, never take the lead". In the 1980s and early 1990s, People's Republic of China continued to establish formal diplomatic relations with a number of countries such as United Arab Emirates (1984), Qatar (1988), Saudi Arabia (1990), Singapore (1990), Israel (1992) and South Korea (1992).

Disasters 
Only major disasters are presented below (click to show).

Controversies 
After the Cultural Revolution, Deng started the Boluan Fanzheng program to correct the Maoist mistakes, but some of his policies and views were controversial. Deng insisted on praising that Mao had done "7 good and 3 bad" for the Chinese people, while attributing numerous disasters in the Cultural Revolution to Lin Biao and the Gang of Four. In addition, he stated and imposed the "Four Cardinal Principles" as the fundamental principles of the Constitution of China (1982), in order to maintain the one-party state in China for the Communist Party.

Moreover, the role that Deng played in the 1989 Tiananmen Square protests and massacre was rather controversial. In fact, he also cracked down the Democracy Wall movement as well as the Beijing Spring in early 1980s.

To cope with the population crisis after Mao's era, Deng Xiaoping, together with other senior officials including Chen Yun and Li Xiannian, supported the implementation of the "one-child policy". Some of the extreme measures in practice created many controversies such as human rights violations.

Jiang Zemin and the third generation (1989–2002)

Transition of power and Deng's Southern Tour 

After the 1989 Tiananmen Square protests and massacre, Deng Xiaoping stepped away from public view and fully retired. Power passed to the third generation of leadership led by Jiang Zemin, who was hailed as its "core". However, owing to the Tiananmen massacre, the Reforms and Opening-up program went into stagnation in early 1990s, and Jiang, supported by left-wing conservatives, was not doing enough to continue the reforms.

In the spring of 1992, Deng made his famous tour to southern China, which is widely regarded as a critical point in the history of modern China as it saved China's economic reform as well as the capital market (Shanghai Stock Exchange and Shenzhen Stock Exchange), and preserved the stability of the society. Jiang eventually sided with Deng and publicly supported the Reforms and Opening-up program. Conservative Li Peng was the Premier of China until 1998, when reformist Zhu Rongji succeeded as the new Premier.

Domestic affairs 

Economic growth achieved a sustained high rate by the mid-1990s. Jiang Zemin's macroeconomic reforms furthered Deng's vision for "Socialism with Chinese characteristics". Jiang laid heavy emphasis on scientific and technological advancement in areas such as space exploration. At the same time, Jiang's period saw a continued rise in social corruption in all areas of life. Unemployment skyrocketed as unprofitable State-owned enterprise (SOE) were closed to make way for more competitive ventures internally and abroad. The ill-equipped social welfare system was put on a serious test. In 2000, Jiang proposed his ideology of "Three Represents", which was ratified by the Chinese Communist Party  at the Sixteenth Party Congress in 2002.

At the same time, Premier Zhu Rongji's economic policies held China's economy strong during the Asian Financial Crisis. Economic growth averaged at 8% annually, pushed back by the 1998 Yangtze River Floods. Standards of living improved significantly, although a wide urban-rural wealth gap was created as China saw the reappearance of the middle class. Wealth disparity between the Eastern coastal regions and the Western hinterlands continued to widen by the day, prompting government programs to "develop the West", taking on ambitious projects such as the Qinghai–Tibet railway. However, rampant corruption continued despite Premier Zhu's anti-corruption campaign that executed many officials. Corruption alone is estimated to amount to the equivalent of anywhere from 10 to 20 percent of China's GDP.

To sustain the increased electricity consumption, the Three Gorges Dam was built, attracting supporters and widespread criticism. Environmental pollution became a very serious problem as Beijing was frequently hit by sandstorms as a result of desertification.

In 1990s, Project 211 and Project 985 were launched for higher education in China.

Foreign relations 

In November 1991, China joined the Asia-Pacific Economic Cooperation. The 1990s saw the peaceful Handover of Hong Kong and Macau by the United Kingdom and Portugal respectively to China. Hong Kong and Macau mostly continued their own governance, retaining independence in their economic, social, and judicial systems until 2019, when Beijing tried to expand national powers in the face of large-scale protests in Hong Kong.

Jiang Zemin and Bill Clinton exchanged state visits, but Sino-American relations took very sour turns at the end of the decade, especially after the third Taiwan Strait Crisis. On 7 May 1999, during the Kosovo War, U.S. aircraft bombed the Chinese embassy in Belgrade. The U.S. government claimed the strike was due to bad intelligence and false target identification. Inside the United States, the Cox Report stated that China had been stealing various top United States military secrets. In 2001, a United States surveillance plane collided with a Chinese fighter jet over international waters near Hainan, inciting further outrage with the Chinese public, already dissatisfied with the United States.

After a decade of talks, China was finally admitted into the World Trade Organization in 2001. The same year saw the establishment of the Shanghai Cooperation Organisation. In August 2002, due to the efforts of the renowned mathematician Shiing-Shen Chern, the quadrennial International Congress of Mathematicians was held in Beijing — the first time in a developing country, with Chern being the honorary president of the Congress and Wu Wenjun being the president.

Disasters 
Only major disasters are presented below (click to show).

Controversies 
On the political agenda, China was once again put on the spotlight for the banning of public Falun Gong activity in 1999. Silent protesters from the spiritual movement sat outside of Zhongnanhai, asking for dialogue with China's leaders. Jiang saw it as a threat to the political situation and outlawed the group altogether, while using mass media propaganda to denounce it as an "evil cult".

Jiang Zemin, after formally retiring as the paramount leader of China in 2004, was believed to have moved behind the scenes and was still in control of the country even after his late step-down from the Chairman of the Central Military Commission in 2005. The Jiang faction, including Zhou Yongkang, Guo Boxiong and Xu Caihou, continued to impact China significantly after Hu Jintao succeeded as the paramount leader of China.

Hu Jintao and the fourth generation (2002–2012)

Transition of power 

Hu Jintao succeeded as the General Secretary of the Chinese Communist Party in November 2002. In March 2003, Hu Jintao became the 6th President of the People's Republic of China, with Wen Jiabao being the Premier of China. In September 2004, Hu Jintao became the Chairman of the Central Military Commission.

Domestic affairs 
The economy continued to grow in double-digit numbers as the development of rural areas became the major focus of government policy. In 2010, China overtook Japan as the world's second-largest economy. The assertion of the Scientific Perspective to create a Socialist Harmonious Society was the focus of the Hu Jintao - Wen Jiabao administration, as some Jiang Zemin-era excesses were slowly reversed. In late 2002, the South–North Water Transfer Project began construction.

In gradual steps to consolidate his power, Hu Jintao removed Shanghai Party secretary Chen Liangyu and other potential political opponents amidst the fight against corruption, and the ongoing struggle against once powerful Shanghai clique. In particular, in 2012, the Wang Lijun incident and the scandal of Bo Xilai received widespread attention and media coverage.

The continued economic growth of the country as well as its sporting power status gained China the right to host the 2008 Summer Olympics. However, this also put Hu Jintao's administration under intense spotlight. While the 2008 Olympics was commonly understood to be a come-out party for People's Republic of China, in light of the March 2008 Tibet protests, the government received heavy scrutiny. The Olympic torch was met with protest en route. Within the country, these reactions were met with a fervent wave of nationalism with accusations of Western bias against China.

Continued economic growth during the worldwide financial crisis which started in the United States and hobbled the world economy increased China's confidence in its model of development and convinced elites that the global balance of power was shifting. In the Chinese view, the cause of the crisis was Western countries' "inappropriate macroeconomic policies" and "unsustainable modes of development." When Western countries were nearing financial disaster, China created credit for spending on infrastructure. This both helped stabilize the global economy and it also provided an opportunity for China to retool its own infrastructure. China increased its standing as a responsible global actor during the crisis. 

Meanwhile, a number of scientific progresses and breakthroughs took place between 2002 and 2012, many of which originated from the 863 Program. In 2003, China successfully sent an astronaut, Yang Liwei, to the space via Shenzhou 5, becoming the third country in the world to do so independently after the United States and the Soviet Union. In 2010, Jiaolong, the Chinese manned deep-sea research submersible, was deployed. In 2011–2012, BeiDou-2, the Chinese satellite navigation system, became operational. In 2011, Tiangong-1, the first prototype space station of China, was successfully launched. In March 2012, results from the Daya Bay Reactor Neutrino Experiment in Shenzhen received international attention. In October 2012, Mo Yan became the first Chinese citizen (mainland) to win the Nobel Prize in Literature.

Foreign relations 
China's position in the war on terror drew the country closer diplomatically to the United States. In 2010, the Asian Games was held in Guangzhou, and in 2011, the Summer Universiade was held in Shenzhen. In 2010, another international event took place in China— Shanghai held the World Expo for the first time.

The political status and future of Taiwan remain uncertain, but steps have been taken to improving relations between the Communist Party and several of Taiwan's parties that hold a less antagonistic view towards China, notably former rival Kuomintang.

Hu's critics say that his government was overly aggressive in asserting its new power, overestimated its reach, and raised the ire and apprehension of various neighbours, including Southeast Asian countries, India, and Japan. Such policies are also said to be provocative towards the United States.

Disasters 
Only major disasters are presented below (click to show).

Controversies 
In the years after Hu Jintao's rise to power, respect of basic human rights in China continued to be a source of concern. Liu Xiaobo, Nobel Peace Prize winner and human rights activist, was arrested and sentenced to jail for 11 years in 2010. Liu Xiaobo, together with others, authored the Charter 08 and received the Nobel Peace Prize in 2010. Liu Xiaobo passed away in 2017.

In Hu Jintao's time, the Chinese Communist Party and the Chinese government created the "50 Cent Party", attempting to "guide" public opinions online in favor of the Communist Party and the Chinese government.

Xi Jinping and the fifth generation (2012–present)

Transition of power 

Xi Jinping became the General Secretary of the Chinese Communist Party and the Chairman of the Central Military Commission, the two most powerful positions on 15 November 2012. And on March 14, 2013, he became the 7th President of China. Li Keqiang became the Premier of China in March 2013.

In October 2022, Xi Jinping was re-elected as General Secretary of the Chinese Communist Party for a precedent-breaking third term of paramount leader after Mao Zedong's death.

Domestic affairs 

A massive, long-term anti-corruption campaign has been carried out under Xi Jinping since 2012, mostly targeting Xi Jinping's political rivals such as members of the Jiang faction including Party senior leaders Zhou Yongkang, Guo Boxiong and Xu Caihou.

In March 2018, the Party-controlled National People's Congress passed a set of constitutional amendments including the removal of term limits for the president and vice president, the creation of a National Supervisory Commission, as well as enhancing the central role of the Communist Party. On 17 March 2018, the Chinese legislature re-appointed Xi Jinping as president, now without term limits. According to the Financial Times, Xi Jinping expressed his views of constitutional amendment at meetings with Chinese officials and foreign dignitaries. Xi Jinping explained the decision in terms of needing to align two more powerful posts — General Secretary of the Chinese Communist Party and Chairman of the Central Military Commission (CMC) — which have no term limits. However, Xi Jinping did not say whether he intended to serve as party general secretary, CMC chairman and state president, for three or more terms.

On the other hand, a series of scientific advances took place. In 2013, the Yutu rover was successfully deployed on the Moon after the Chang'e 3 lander landed on the Moon. In 2015, Tu Youyou became the first Chinese citizen (mainland) to win the Nobel Prize in Physiology or Medicine. In December 2015, the Dark Matter Particle Explorer, China's first space observatory, was successfully launched. The Tiangong-2 space laboratory was successfully launched in 2016, and in the same year the Five-hundred-meter Aperture Spherical Telescope (FAST) was built in Guizhou. In 2018, the Hong Kong–Zhuhai–Macau Bridge, world's longest sea-crossing bridge, was open to public.

Foreign relations 

As Xi Jinping continued to consolidate power domestically, he gradually abandoned the diplomatic principles ("hide your strength, bide your time, never take the lead") set by Deng Xiaoping and appeared more as a "strongman" in the global stage. He launched the "One Belt One Road initiative" to make infrastructure investment in dozens of countries, which received widespread attention (both receptions and criticism) from around the world.

Since Xi Jinping succeeded as the leader of China, he tried to change "China's passivity" into an assertive strategy to defend China's claims over border and territory disputes such as in the South China Sea and in Taiwan. In 2018, China–United States trade war started and significantly affected the global economy. In May 2020, China–India skirmishes along the border broke out and resulted in casualties.

On the other hand, after Xi Jinping came to power, a number of international summits were held in China. In 2014, the 22nd annual gathering of Asia-Pacific Economic Cooperation (APEC) leaders was held in Beijing; in 2016, the G20 summit was held in Hangzhou; and in 2017, the 9th BRICS summit was held in Xiamen. Additionally, in 2015, the Ma–Xi meeting in Singapore was the first meeting between the political leaders of the two sides of the Taiwan Strait since the end of the Chinese Civil War in 1950.

China refused to condemn the Russian invasion of Ukraine, repeated Russian propaganda about the war, opposed economic sanctions against Russia, and abstained or sided with Russia in UN votes on the war in Ukraine.

Disasters 
Only major disasters are presented below (click to show).

Controversies 

Since 2012, Xi Jinping together with his allies has rolled back several policies from the Boluan Fanzheng period of Deng Xiaoping and promoted his cult of personality as Mao Zedong did. For example, in 2018, Xi Jinping eliminated the term limit in China's Constitution for Chinese President, which challenged some of the political legacies of Deng Xiaoping and triggered concerns about a return to a one-man rule similar to Mao.

Domestic human rights violation has deteriorated. In July 2015, hundreds of Chinese lawyers and human rights activists nationwide were detained or arrested during the 709 crackdown. Moreover, the Xinjiang re-education camps since 2017, in which over a million Uyghurs and other ethnic minorities are being detained, and the massive protests in Hong Kong since 2019 have received widespread attention and extensive media coverage from around the world. The Hong Kong national security law published on 30 June 2020 also received widespread attention and raised considerable concern worldwide over the breach of the "One Country, Two Systems" principle.

After Xi Jinping came to power in 2012, the Communist Party along with the Chinese government have significantly strengthened their internet censorship and tightened their control over the Chinese internet environment, blocking Chinese citizens' access to many foreign websites and mobile apps using the "Great Firewall". At the same time, a large number of "50 Cent Party" members have been recruited to "guide" online narratives around the globe in favor of the Party and the Government. During the massive Hong Kong protests, for instance, Twitter and Facebook claimed to have removed or suspended over 200,000 accounts and pages linked with the Chinese government. As of 2022, the mass surveillance system keeps the whole population under close watch.

Globally, the aggressive "wolf warrior diplomacy" under Xi Jinping Administration has created numerous controversies and backlashes. Controversies also surround the "One Belt One Road initiative" and the China–United States trade war. In 2019–2020, under Xi Jinping, China's handling of the outbreak of a novel coronavirus (COVID-19) as well as its relationship with the World Health Organization (WHO) was rather controversial. There have been a large number of conspiracy theories and misinformation related to COVID-19, including the origin of the virus. China has also launched its own disinformation campaign globally over the issues of the pandemic, of Hong Kong and Uyghurs, and more, promoting China as a global leader while attacking the United States for instance. Furthermore, manipulation of economic data by the Chinese government, such as publishing inflated GDP figures over the years, is also a major concern.

See also 

 History of China
 History of the Republic of China
 History of Hong Kong
 History of Macau
 Dynasties in Chinese History
 Economic History of China
 Foreign relations of China
 History of foreign relations of China
 Historiography of China
 History of Chinese Art
 History of education in China
 History of science and technology in China
 Legal History of China
 Linguistic History of China
 Military history of China
 Naval history of China
 Timeline of Chinese history

References

Further reading 
 Benson, Linda. China since 1949 (3rd ed. Routledge, 2016).  excerpt; also online review
 Chang, Gordon H. Friends and enemies: the United States, China, and the Soviet Union, 1948-1972 (1990) online free to borrow
 Coase, Ronald, and Ning Wang. How China became capitalist. (Springer, 2016).
 Economy, Elizabeth C. "China's New Revolution: The Reign of Xi Jinping." Foreign Affairs 97 (2018): 60+. online
 Economy, Elizabeth C.  The Third Revolution: Xi Jinping and the New Chinese State (Oxford UP, 2018), 343 pp. 
 Evans, Richard. Deng Xiaoping and the making of modern China (1997)
Ezra F. Vogel. Deng Xiaoping and the Transformation of China. . 2013.
 Falkenheim, Victor C. ed. Chinese Politics from Mao to Deng (1989) 11 essays by scholars
 Fenby, Jonathan. The Penguin History of Modern China: The Fall and Rise of a Great Power 1850 to the Present (3rd ed. 2019)
 Fravel, M. Taylor. Active Defense: China's Military Strategy since 1949 (Princeton University Press, 2019) online reviews
 Garver, John W. China's Quest: The History of the Foreign Relations of the People's Republic (2nd ed. 2018) comprehensive scholarly history. excerpt
 Lampton, David M. Following the Leader: Ruling China, from Deng Xiaoping to Xi Jinping (2014) online
 Lynch, Michael. Access to History: Mao's China 1936–97 (3rd ed. Hachette UK, 2015)
 MacFarquhar, Roderick, ed. The politics of China: The eras of Mao and Deng (Cambridge UP, 1997).
 Meisner, Maurice. Mao's China and after: A history of the People's Republic (3rd ed. 1999).
 Mühlhahn, Klaus.  Making China Modern: From the Great Qing to Xi Jinping (Harvard UP, 2019) excerpt
 Shambaugh, David, ed. China and the World (Oxford UP, 2020). essays by scholars. excerpt
 Sullivan, Lawrence R. Historical Dictionary of the People's Republic of China (2007)
 Wasserstrom,  Jeffrey. Vigil: Hong Kong on the Brink (2020) Political protest 2003–2019.
 Westad, Odd Arne. Restless empire: China and the world since 1750 (2012) Online free to borrow

Historiography and memory
 Eben V. Racknitz, Ines. "Repositioning History for the Future – Recent Academic Debates in China" History Compass (2014) 12#6 pp. 465–472. 
 Finnane, Antonia. "Reinventing Modern China: Imagination and Authenticity in Chinese Historical Writing." Asian Studies Review 39#1 (2015): 163–164.
 Fromm, Martin T. Borderland Memories: Searching for Historical Identity in Post-Mao China (Cambridge UP, 2019).
 Longxi, Zhang. "Re-conceptualizing China in our Time: From a Chinese Perspective." European Review 23#2 (2015): 193–209.
 Smith, Stephen A. "Recent historiography of the People's Republic of China, 1949-76." Twentieth Century Communism 3.3 (2011): 196–216.
 Unger, Jonathan. Using the Past to Serve the Present: Historiography and Politics in Contemporary China (Routledge, 2015)
 Wu, Guo. "Recalling bitterness: Historiography, memory, and myth in Maoist China." Twentieth-Century China 39.3 (2014): 245–268. online

External links 
 Cold War International History Project: Document Collection on China in the Cold War
 "Rethinking ‘Capitalist Restoration’ in China" by Yiching Wu
 Peoples Republic of China by P.M. Calabrese
 China Timeline: A Chronology of Key Events in China by Gerhard K. Heilig
 China from the Inside – 2006 PBS documentary. KQED Public Television and Granada Television for PBS, Granada International and the BBC.
 Map of situation in East Asia at the time of declaration of the People's Republic of China (omniatlas.com)